is a member of the Imperial House of Japan and the elder daughter of Prince Tomohito of Mikasa and Princess Tomohito of Mikasa (Nobuko).

Biography

Education

Princess Akiko graduated from Gakushuin University in Tokyo with a bachelor's degree in History. While she was at Gakushuin, she spent the 2001–2002 academic year studying abroad at Merton College, Oxford to major in Japanese art history.

In 2004, she returned to the University of Oxford as a doctoral student at the Faculty of Oriental Studies. Her research topic was William Anderson Collection at the British Museum – Western Interest in Japanese Art in the Nineteenth Century. 
William Anderson (1842–1900) was an English surgeon who taught anatomy and surgery in Japan and became an important scholar and collector of Japanese art.

In December 2006, Princess Akiko assisted the University of Tokyo in opening a special exhibition on the 19th-century art movement known as Japonism.

In July 2007, she participated in a symposium at Ochanomizu University on the art collection of William Anderson. From January to May 2008, she was at the Clark Center for Japanese Art and Culture in Hanford, California doing research for her thesis.

Akiko became a doctoral student at Merton College in the United Kingdom from October 2004 till January 2010 when she passed her final examination. In 2011, she was awarded a D.Phil. degree from the University of Oxford, thereby becoming the second member of the Japanese imperial household to achieve a doctorate (Fumihito, Prince Akishino, was the first who earned a PhD degree in Ornithology from the Graduate University for Advanced Studies in October 1996).

Career
Princess Akiko worked as a postdoctoral fellow at the Kinugasa Research Organization, Ritsumeikan University in Kyoto from October 2009 to March 2012. She was appointed as a Special Invited Associate Professor at the Kinugasa Research Organization, Ritsumeikan University, from April 2012 to March 2013, and was also appointed as a visiting associate professor at the same organization from April 2013 to March 2014, and again as a visiting researcher in May 2014. Akiko was inaugurated as the visiting researcher at the Hosei University Research Center for International Japanese Studies in May 2012. She was inaugurated as the president of Shinyusha, General Incorporated Association in April 2013. She was appointed as a Guest Research Fellow at the Archival Research Center of Kyoto City University of Arts in April 2014 and was inaugurated as the president of the Ski Instructors Association of Japan in the same month. She is also the president of the Middle Eastern Culture Center in Japan. Princess Akiko has also worked as a guest professor in Kyoto City University of Arts. Other positions held by her include: research fellow at the Institute of Japanese Culture in Kyoto Sangyo University, visiting fellow at the Global Exchange Organisation for Research and Education (GEORE) of Gakushuin University, and special guest professor in Kokugakuin University.

Public appearances

In July 1998, Princess Akiko paid a visit to Turkey for the first time. The trip was done under the arrangement of the Middle Eastern Culture Center, an organisation associated with her grandfather. During the trip the Princess viewed the remains of Kaman-Kalehöyük alongside many other sites. Princess Akiko came of age in December 2001 and started attending official ceremonies and events in Japan with the other members of the Imperial Family.

In June 2003, Princess Akiko went on a tour of the heritage of Turkey that her father had planned.

In July 2010, she also visited "the Dedication Ceremony of the Museum of Archaeology Kaman-Kalehöyük, Japanese Institute of Anatolian Archaeology". In January 2011, she went to Austria. The main purpose of this trip was attending the 19th INTERSKI Congress held in St. Anton.

On 4 September 2013, Princess Akiko departed for Argentina to meet with members of International Olympic Committee, where members wanted to elect the host city for the 2020 Summer Olympics, with candidates being Madrid, Istanbul and Tokyo. Princess Akiko and Princess Takamado were part of the Japanese delegation, supporting Tokyo's successful Olympic bid. On 6 September, Princess Akiko toured a Japanese garden in Buenos Aires with the president of Argentina's Japanese Cultural Foundation, Kazunori Kosaka.

She also made an official visit to Chile from 7 to 12 September 2013. During her stay, Princess Akiko of Mikasa met with President Sebastián Piñera and toured Easter Island. Princess Akiko visited University of Santiago for a conference and conversation with the students of Japanese translation and linguistics. She visited Valparaíso Viña Viu Manent to learn more about Chilean wine, which is popular in Japan.

From 23 to 30 April 2014, Princess Akiko visited Turkey. On 27 April, the Princess attended the memorial concert for Prince Tomohito held by the Turkish government. Princess Akiko was named president of the Japan-Turkey Society, a post formerly held by Prince Tomohito.

In May 2016 Princess Akiko made a public appearance at the Fifth World Butoku Sai in Kyoto, Japan sponsored by the Dai Nippon Butoku Kai martial arts organization. This was notable as it was the first time in the event's 121-year history that she had attended.

In September 2018, the Princess undertook a tour of Turkey, during which she met with Turkish officials and visited archaeological sites and museums in Istanbul, Ankara, and Kırşehir. She was also appointed as the honorary president of Prince Mikasa Foundation, an institution founded in 2017 to provide support for the Japanese Institute of Anatolian Archaeology.

Prince Tomohito's death
On 6 June 2012, Prince Tomohito died from multiple organ failure. His funeral and ceremony was hosted by Princess Akiko. In June 2013 in a statement about the Prince's household, it was announced by the Imperial Household Agency that "it [had] reduced the number of households in the Imperial family by one", integrating it into the household led by his father. According to the agency's officials the household integration won't have any effect on the lives of the widow and daughters of Prince Tomohito.

Health
On 6 December 2013, Emperor Akihito and Empress Michiko returned from their visit to India. The Imperial Family gathered at Haneda Airport to greet them. At the airport, Princess Akiko suddenly collapsed. She was taken to Keio University Hospital and was diagnosed with cerebral anemia.

In 2017, she was reported to have visited Kyoto Prefectural University of Medicine's hospital in Kyoto due to asthma and high fever.

At the end of July 2022, Princess Akiko was admitted to Kyoto Prefectural University of Medicine Hospital in Kyoto due to an asthma attack. It was discovered, however, that she had COVID-19 and her symptoms were described as muscle aches and fever.

Titles and styles

Akiko is styled as Her Imperial Highness Princess Akiko.

Honours

National honours
 Member 2nd Class (Peony) of the Order of the Precious Crown –

Footnotes

External links

 Her Imperial Highness Princess Mikasa and her family at the Imperial Household Agency website

Japanese princesses
Japanese art historians
1981 births
Living people
Japanese women historians
Women art historians
People from Tokyo
Gakushuin University alumni
Alumni of Merton College, Oxford
Order of the Precious Crown members
20th-century Japanese women
21st-century Japanese women